St. Ita's Hospital is a mental health facility in Portrane, Ireland.

History
The site selected for the facility, which extended , was the Portrane House estate, the former home of the Evans family. The facility was the subject of a design competition which was won by George Ashlin but his proposed price exceeded the budgeted cost and he was asked to reduce the price: the eminent architect, Sir Thomas Drew, objected to Ashlin being selected on this basis. The facility, which was ultimately designed by Ashlin in the Gothic Revival style, opened as the Portrane Asylum in 1903. At a cost of 300,000 it was the most expensive building ever commissioned up to that time by the British Government in Ireland.

St. Ita's Hospital Radio commenced broadcasting in December 1983 and was the first radio station in Ireland to receive one of the new broadcast licenses after the provisions of the Broadcasting bill were brought into operation in 1988.

After the introduction of deinstitutionalisation in the late 1980s the hospital went into a period of decline. Nearly 500,000 viewers watched an episode of the RTÉ documentary The Asylum which featured St Ita's Hospital in 2005.

In June 2010, the Mental Health Commission instructed the hospital to stop the admission of acute patients on account of the "entirely unacceptable and inhumane conditions" by 28 February 2011. The hospital closed to inpatients in March 2011 and to outpatients as well in January 2014.

The Health Service Executive announced in February 2012 that the Central Mental Hospital would locate to the former site of the old St Ita's Hospital. The construction works, which are being undertaken by Rhatigan OHL at a cost of €140 million, are expected to be completed in late 2019.

References

External links
Mental Health Services - North Dublin

Hospital buildings completed in 1903
Hospitals established in 1903
Hospitals in Fingal
Itas
Health Service Executive hospitals
Defunct hospitals in the Republic of Ireland
2014 disestablishments in Ireland
Hospitals disestablished in 2014
Gothic Revival architecture in Ireland
Buildings listed on the Fingal Record of Protected Structures